John Fee (born April 22, 1951) is an American luger. He competed at the 1976 Winter Olympics and the 1980 Winter Olympics.

References

1951 births
Living people
American male lugers
Olympic lugers of the United States
Lugers at the 1976 Winter Olympics
Lugers at the 1980 Winter Olympics
People from Plattsburgh, New York